The Río del Oro is a river of southern Mexico. It is a tributary of the Balsas River, originating in the Sierra Madre del Sur of Guerrero state and flowing northwards to join the Balsas.

See also
List of rivers of Mexico

References
Atlas of Mexico, 1975 (http://www.lib.utexas.edu/maps/atlas_mexico/river_basins.jpg).
The Prentice Hall American World Atlas, 1984.
Rand McNally, The New International Atlas, 1993.

Balsas River
Rivers of Guerrero